Toyotaro Miyazaki (1944-2021) was the head of the International Shotokai Federation.

Miyazaki was born September 25, 1944 in Tokyo, Japan.  At college he majored in Economics. He left Japan and moved to California in 1966.

He began his karate training at 15 at the KenKoJuku Dojo under Tomasaburo Okano, who was a direct student of the founder of Shotokan Karate Gichin Funakoshi. He trained in Kenkojuku Karate (Shotokan Style) in Japan until his mid twenties before coming to the United States.  He served as the head instructor of Tokutai Karate-Do.

Upon arriving in the United States he quickly achieved fame in both kata and kumite. He fought the likes of Dwight Frazier and others.   He also competed against Grant Campbell, a top US competitor and Kevin Thompson (karate). Miyazaki had a top 10 ranking in karate for 2 decades.  His skills brought him to be on the cover of Black Belt Magazine, Karate Illustrated, and Official Karate Magazine.  He retired from competition in 1971.  Chuck Norris described Miyazaki as one of his toughest opponents.

Established in Flushing over 40 years ago, Miyazaki has taught thousands of students and has produced hundreds of black belts, some of whom have become Instructors at their own Karate Dojos.

Miyazaki is also a former instructor of the Long Island University Karate Instructor Certification Program.

Toyotaro Miyazaki passed away on August 11, 2021, while residing in Japan.

His students include
Kai Leung
George Aschkar
Shihan Gustavo Larrea, Jorge Decena,
Nixon Feliz., Vincent Riqueros,
and Ian Rugel, 9th dan in Ecuador, Victor Garrido 7th Degree Black Belt and ISF of International Shotokai Federation, and Beatriz Elster 5th Degree Black Belt, and 5th degree black belt Gabriel Trance who moved to Washington State and opened a school in the town of Tumwater.

References

External links
 http://www.shotokai-usa.com/
 http://www.shotojuku.com/obkai/miyazaki.html
 http://www.internationalshotokaifederation.org
 http://www.victorgarridosensei.com
 https://www.amazon.com/Powerful-Senior-Spanish-Beatriz-Martinez/dp/1727721020
 https://www.amazon.com/El-Arte-Ense%C3%B1ar-Karate-Do-convertirse/dp/1981948295

1944 births
Living people
American male karateka
Shotokan practitioners
Sportspeople from Tokyo
Japanese emigrants to the United States
American sportspeople of Japanese descent
Martial arts school founders